Xenicotela distincta is a species of beetle in the family Cerambycidae. It was described by Charles Joseph Gahan in 1888. It is known from Vietnam, India and Laos. It contains the varietas Xenicotela distincta var. tonkinensis.

References

Lamiinae
Beetles described in 1888